Victorine Goddard (née Rogers; October 1844 – 12 October 1935) was a New Zealand homemaker and hotel-keeper. She was born in Waiwhakaiho, Taranaki, New Zealand, on 5 October 1844.

References

1844 births
1935 deaths
People from Taranaki
19th-century New Zealand businesspeople
19th-century New Zealand businesswomen